Trace amine-associated receptor 1 (TAAR1) is a trace amine-associated receptor (TAAR) protein that in humans is encoded by the TAAR1 gene. TAAR1 is an intracellular amine-activated  and  G protein-coupled receptor (GPCR) that is primarily expressed in several peripheral organs and cells (e.g., the stomach, small intestine, duodenum, and white blood cells), astrocytes, and in the intracellular milieu within the presynaptic plasma membrane (i.e., axon terminal) of monoamine neurons in the central nervous system (CNS). TAAR1 was discovered in 2001 by two independent groups of investigators, Borowski et al. and Bunzow et al. TAAR1 is one of six functional human trace amine-associated receptors, which are so named for their ability to bind endogenous amines that occur in tissues at trace concentrations. TAAR1 plays a significant role in regulating neurotransmission in dopamine, norepinephrine, and serotonin neurons in the CNS; it also affects immune system and neuroimmune system function through different mechanisms.

TAAR1 is a high-affinity receptor for amphetamine, methamphetamine, dopamine, and trace amines which mediates some of their cellular effects in monoamine neurons within the central nervous system.

The primary endogenous ligands of the human TAAR1 (hTAAR1) receptor, by rank order of potency, are:tyramine > β-phenethylamine > dopamine = octopamine.

Discovery 
TAAR1 was discovered independently by Borowski et al. and Bunzow et al. in 2001. To find the genetic variants responsible for TAAR1 synthesis, they used mixtures of oligonucleotides with sequences related to G protein-coupled receptors (GPCRs) of serotonin and dopamine to discover novel DNA sequences in rat genomic DNA and cDNA, which they then amplified and cloned. The resulting sequence was not found in any database and coded for TAAR1. Further characterization of the functional role of TAAR1 and other receptors from this family was performed by other researchers including Raul Gainetdinov and his colleagues.

Structure 
TAAR1 shares structural similarities with the class A rhodopsin GPCR subfamily. It has 7 transmembrane domains with short N and C terminal extensions. TAAR1 is 62–96% identical with TAARs2-15, which suggests that the TAAR subfamily has recently evolved; while at the same time, the low degree of similarity between TAAR1 orthologues suggests that they are rapidly evolving. TAAR1 shares a predictive peptide motif with all other TAARs. This motif overlaps with transmembrane domain VII, and its identity is NSXXNPXX[Y,H]XXX[Y,F]XWF. TAAR1 and its homologues have ligand pocket vectors that utilize sets of 35 amino acids known to be involved directly in receptor-ligand interaction.

Gene 
All human TAAR genes are located on a single chromosome spanning 109 kb of human chromosome 6q23.1, 192 kb of mouse chromosome 10A4, and 216 kb of rat chromosome 1p12. Each TAAR is derived from a single exon, except for TAAR2, which is coded by two exons. The human TAAR1 gene is thought to be an intronless gene.

Tissue distribution 

To date, TAAR1 has been identified and cloned in five different mammal genomes: human, mouse, rat, monkey, and chimpanzee. In rats, mRNA for TAAR1 is found at low to moderate levels in peripheral tissues like the stomach, kidney, intestines and lungs, and at low levels in the brain. Rhesus monkey Taar1 and human TAAR1 share high sequence similarity, and TAAR1 mRNA is highly expressed in the same important monoaminergic regions of both species. These regions include the dorsal and ventral caudate nucleus, putamen, substantia nigra, nucleus accumbens, ventral tegmental area, locus coeruleus, amygdala, and raphe nucleus. hTAAR1 has also been identified in human astrocytes.

Outside of the human central nervous system, hTAAR1 also occurs as an intracellular receptor and is primarily expressed in the stomach, intestines, duodenum, pancreatic , and white blood cells.  In the duodenum, TAAR1 activation increases   (GLP-1) and peptide YY (PYY) release; in the stomach, hTAAR1 activation has been observed to increase somatostatin (growth  hormone) secretion from delta cells.

hTAAR1 is the only human trace amine-associated receptor subtype that is not expressed within the human olfactory epithelium.

Location within neurons 
TAAR1 is an intracellular receptor expressed within the presynaptic terminal of monoamine neurons in humans and other animals. In model cell systems, hTAAR1 has extremely poor membrane expression. A method to induce hTAAR1 membrane expression has been used to study its pharmacology via a bioluminescence resonance energy transfer cAMP assay.

Because TAAR1 is an intracellular receptor in monoamine neurons, exogenous TAAR1 ligands must enter the presynaptic neuron through a membrane transport protein or be able to diffuse across the presynaptic membrane in order to reach the receptor and produce reuptake inhibition and neurotransmitter efflux. Consequently, the efficacy of a particular TAAR1 ligand in producing these effects in different monoamine neurons is a function of both its binding affinity at TAAR1 and its capacity to move across the presynaptic membrane at each type of neuron.  The variability between a TAAR1 ligand's substrate affinity at the various monoamine transporters accounts for much of the difference in its capacity to produce neurotransmitter release and reuptake inhibition in different types of monoamine neurons. E.g., a TAAR1 ligand which can easily pass through the norepinephrine transporter, but not the serotonin transporter, will produce – all else equal – markedly greater TAAR1-induced effects in norepinephrine neurons as compared to serotonin neurons.

Receptor oligomers 

TAAR1 forms GPCR oligomers with monoamine autoreceptors in neurons in vivo. These and other reported TAAR1 hetero-oligomers include:
TAAR1–D2sh
TAAR1–α2A
TAAR1–TAAR2

Ligands

Agonists

Trace amines 

Trace amines are endogenous amines which act as agonists at TAAR1 and are present in extracellular concentrations of 0.1–10  in the brain, constituting less than 1% of total biogenic amines in the mammalian nervous system. Some of the human trace amines include tryptamine, phenethylamine (PEA), and synephrine. These share structural similarities with the three common monoamines: serotonin, dopamine, and norepinephrine. Each ligand has a different potency, measured as increased cyclic AMP (cAMP) concentration after the binding event.

Thyronamines 
Thyronamines are molecular derivatives of the thyroid hormone and are very important for endocrine system function. 3-Iodothyronamine (T1AM) is the most potent TAAR1 agonist yet discovered, although it lacks monoamine transporter affinity and therefore has little effect in monoamine neurons of the central nervous system. Activation of TAAR1 by T1AM results in the production of large amounts of cAMP. This effect is coupled with decreased body temperature and cardiac output.

Synthetic 
 Amphetamine and its substituted derivatives methamphetamine and MDMA are all potent hTAAR1 agonists. Upon association with TAAR1, they elicit increases in cAMP production similar to those of PEA and p-tyramine. These compounds are structurally similar to PEA and p-tyramine.
Benzofurans: 5-APB, 5-APDB, 6-APB, 6-APDB, 4-APB, 7-APB, 5-EAPB, and 5-MAPDB, as well as the benzodifuran 2C-B-FLY, are  agonists that have an MDMA-like pharmacodynamic profile.
Certain 2-aminooxazoline compounds (RO5166017, RO5256390, RO5203648, and RO5263397) are orally bioavailable, highly potent, and selective agonists of TAAR1 in laboratory animals.
 RO5166017 or (S)-4-[(ethylphenylamino)methyl]-4,5-dihydrooxazol-2-ylamine is a selective TAAR1 agonist without significant activity at other targets.
 RO5203648 and RO5263397 are highly selective TAAR1 partial agonists.  RO5203648 demonstrated clear antidepressant and anti-psychotic activity, additionally it attenuated drug self-administration and exhibited wakefulness promoting and cognition enhancing properties in murine and simian models.
Ulotaront, investigational antipsychotic.

Partial agonists
Ralmitaront, investigational antipsychotic.

Inverse agonists
 EPPTB or N-(3-ethoxyphenyl)-4-(pyrrolidin-1-yl)-3-trifluoromethylbenzamide is a selective hTAAR1 inverse agonist.

Neutral antagonists 
 no neutral antagonists for hTAAR1 have been characterized.

Function

Monoaminergic systems 
Before the discovery of TAAR1, trace amines were believed to serve very limited functions. They were thought to induce noradrenaline release from sympathetic nerve endings and compete for catecholamine or serotonin binding sites on cognate receptors, transporters, and storage sites. Today, they are believed to play a much more dynamic role by regulating monoaminergic systems in the brain.

One of the downstream effects of active TAAR1 is to increase cAMP in the presynaptic cell via Gαs G-protein activation of adenylyl cyclase. This alone can have a multitude of cellular consequences. A main function of the cAMP may be to up-regulate the expression of trace amines in the cell cytoplasm. These amines would then activate intracellular TAAR1. Monoamine autoreceptors (e.g., D2 short, presynaptic α2, and presynaptic 5-HT1A) have the opposite effect of TAAR1, and together these receptors provide a regulatory system for monoamines. Notably, amphetamine and trace amines possess high binding affinities for TAAR1, but not for monoamine autoreceptors. The effect of TAAR1 agonists on monoamine transporters in the brain appears to be site-specific. Imaging studies indicate that monoamine reuptake inhibition by amphetamine and trace amines is dependent upon the presence of TAAR1  in the associated monoamine neurons.  As of 2010,  of TAAR1 and the dopamine transporter (DAT) has been visualized in rhesus monkeys, but  of TAAR1 with the norepinephrine transporter (NET) and the serotonin transporter (SERT) has only been evidenced by messenger RNA (mRNA) expression.

In neurons with  TAAR1, TAAR1 agonists increase the concentrations of the associated monoamines in the synaptic cleft, thereby increasing post-synaptic receptor binding. Through direct activation of G protein-coupled inwardly-rectifying potassium channels (GIRKs), TAAR1 can reduce the firing rate of dopamine neurons, in turn preventing a hyper-dopaminergic state.  Amphetamine and trace amines can enter the presynaptic neuron either through  or by diffusing across the neuronal membrane directly. As a consequence of DAT uptake, amphetamine and trace amines produce competitive reuptake inhibition at the transporter. Upon entering the presynaptic neuron, these compounds activate TAAR1 which, through protein kinase A (PKA) and protein kinase C (PKC) signaling, causes DAT phosphorylation. Phosphorylation by either protein kinase can result in DAT internalization ( reuptake inhibition), but  phosphorylation alone induces reverse transporter function (dopamine efflux).

Immune system 

Expression of TAAR1 on lymphocytes is associated with activation of lymphocyte immuno-characteristics. In the immune system, TAAR1 transmits signals through active PKA and PKC phosphorylation cascades. In a 2012 study, Panas et al. observed that methamphetamine had these effects, suggesting that, in addition to brain monoamine regulation, amphetamine-related compounds may have an effect on the immune system.  A recent paper showed that, along with TAAR1, TAAR2 is required for full activity of trace amines in PMN cells.

Phytohaemagglutinin upregulates  mRNA in circulating leukocytes; in these cells, TAAR1 activation mediates leukocyte chemotaxis toward TAAR1 agonists. TAAR1 agonists (specifically, trace amines) have also been shown to induce interleukin 4 secretion in T-cells and immunoglobulin E (IgE) secretion in B cells.

Astrocyte-localized TAAR1 regulates EAAT2 levels and function in these cells; this has been implicated in methamphetamine-induced pathologies of the neuroimmune system.

Clinical  significance 

Low phenethylamine (PEA) concentration in the brain is associated with major depressive disorder, and high concentrations are associated with schizophrenia. Low PEA levels and under-activation of TAAR1 also appears to be associated with ADHD. It is hypothesized that insufficient PEA levels result in TAAR1 inactivation and overzealous monoamine uptake by transporters, possibly resulting in depression. Some antidepressants function by inhibiting monoamine oxidase (MAO), which increases the concentration of trace amines, which is speculated to increase TAAR1 activation in presynaptic cells. Decreased PEA metabolism has been linked to schizophrenia, a logical finding considering excess PEA would result in over-activation of TAAR1 and prevention of monoamine transporter function. Mutations in region q23.1 of human chromosome 6 – the same chromosome that codes for TAAR1 – have been linked to schizophrenia.

Medical reviews from February 2015 and 2016 noted that TAAR1-selective ligands have significant therapeutic potential for treating psychostimulant addictions (e.g., cocaine, amphetamine, methamphetamine, etc.). Despite wide distribution outside of the CNS and PNS, TAAR1 does not affect hematological functions and the regulation of thyroid hormones across different stages of ageing. Such data represent that future TAAR1-based therapies should exert little hematological effect and thus will likely have a good safety profile.

Research

A large candidate gene association study published in September 2011 found significant differences in TAAR1 allele frequencies between a cohort of fibromyalgia patients and a chronic pain-free control group, suggesting this gene may play an important role in the pathophysiology of the condition; this possibly presents a target for therapeutic intervention.

In preclinical research on rats, TAAR1 activation in pancreatic cells promotes insulin, peptide YY, and GLP-1 secretion; therefore, TAAR1 is potentially a biological target for the treatment of obesity and diabetes.

Lack of TAAR1 does not significantly affect sexual motivation and routine lipid and metabolic blood biochemical parameters, suggesting that future TAAR1-based therapies should have a favorable safety profile.

Notes

References

External links

G protein-coupled receptors
TAAR1 agonists
Amphetamine